Pete Sampras defeated Thomas Muster to win the 1993 Peters NSW Open men's singles event.

Seeds

Draws

Finals

Section 1

Section 2

References

Men's Singles